Literary and Historical Society may refer to:
Literary and Historical Society (University College Dublin) a debating society at University College Dublin, Ireland
Literary and Historical Society of Quebec, a learned society in Quebec, Canada